Richard Michaels (born February 15, 1936, in Brooklyn, New York) is a retired American film and TV show director and producer whose career spanned five decades.

His directing credits include the television series Bewitched, The Brady Bunch, Love, American Style and the TV movies Once an Eagle (1976), Homeward Bound (1980 TV movie)', The Children Nobody Wanted (1981), Sadat (1983), Silence of the Heart (1984), Rockabye (1986), I'll Take Manhattan (1987),Leona Helmsley: The Queen of Mean (1990) (Suzanne Pleshette was nominated for an Emmy and a Golden Globe for her portrayal of Leona Helmsley), Father and Scout (1994).

Personal life

Marriages
Michaels has been married three times. His first was to Toby Michaels from 1959 to 1962. His second marriage was to actress Kristina Hansen in 1964; they divorced in 1972. In 1986 he married Judith Penrod; they currently reside in Makena, Hawaii.

Relationship with Elizabeth Montgomery
Michaels was one of the directors of the TV series Bewitched in the 1960s and early 1970s. Actress Elizabeth Montgomery was the star of the show and her husband William Asher served as producer. During the show's last season in 1971, Montgomery and Michaels, friends and working partners since 1964, fell in love and began a romantic relationship, subsequently moving in together. The affair was the end of both their marriages and, because Asher and Montgomery's company Ashmont produced Bewitched, it was also the end of the show. Michaels and Montgomery were together 2½ years.

Children
Michaels has a son, Gregory Michaels, and a daughter, Meredith Michaels-Beerbaum, with Hansen. Michaels-Beerbaum was born on December 26, 1969, and is an Olympic equestrian who lives in Germany. She won team bronze in Rio in 2016.

References

External links

1936 births
Living people
American television directors
Television producers from New York City
People from Brooklyn
Film directors from New York City